The 2008 NCAA Division II football season, part of college football in the United States organized by the National Collegiate Athletic Association at the Division II level, began on August 30, 2008, and concluded with the NCAA Division II Football Championship on December 15, 2008 at Braly Municipal Stadium in Florence, Alabama, hosted by the University of North Alabama. The Minnesota–Duluth Bulldogs defeated the Northwest Missouri State Bearcats, 21–14, to win their first Division II national title.

The Harlon Hill Trophy was awarded to Bernard Scott, running back from Abilene Christian.

Conference and program changes

Brevard, Central State, Dixie State, and Seton Hill completed their transitions to Division II and became eligible for the postseason.

Regional realignment
The geographic names of the four super regions gave way to numerical names. The Northeast Region, with the addition of the CIAA, became Super Region 1; the Southeast Region minus the CIAA became Super Region 2. The Northwest Region, with the addition of the RMAC and loss of the defunct NCC, became Super Region 3, while the Southwest Region, minus the RMAC and with the addition of the GNAC (sponsoring football again after a two-year hiatus) became Super Region 4.

Conference standings

Super Region 1

Super Region 2

Super Region 3

Super Region 4

Conference summaries

Postseason

The 2008 NCAA Division II Football Championship playoffs involved 24 schools playing in a single-elimination tournament to determine the national champion of men's NCAA Division II college football.

The tournament began on November 15, 2008 and concluded on December 13, 2008 with the 2008 NCAA Division II National Football Championship game at Braly Municipal Stadium near the campus of the University of North Alabama in Florence, Alabama.

In the championship game the University of Minnesota Duluth Bulldogs defeated the Northwest Missouri State University Bearcats, 21–14.

Participants

Bids by conference

Playoff format
The first-round games were conducted on the campus of one of the competing institutions as determined by the NCAA Division II Football Committee. Two teams in each super regional earned first-round byes. The first-round winners advanced to face a bye team in their super regional. Second-round winners met in the quarterfinals and quarterfinal winners advanced to play in the semifinals.

First-round, second-round, quarterfinal and semifinal games were played on the campus of one of the competing institutions as determined by the NCAA Division II Football Committee. The home team at the championship was determined by the Division II Football Committee and the Shoals National Championship Committee.

National television coverage
The championship game was played at Braly Municipal Stadium in Florence, Alabama and broadcast live on ESPN2 on December 16.

The semifinal games were broadcast on ESPN2 (North Alabama vs. Northwest Mo., 4pm EST) and ESPN Classic (California (PA) vs. Minnesota-Duluth, 12pm EST) on December 6.

The Superregional championship (quarterfinal) games were broadcast on ESPN2 and ESPN Classic on November 29.

Tournament Notes

Final standings

Bracket and standings

Super Regional 1

Super Regional 3

Super Regional 2

Super Regional 4

Semifinals and championship

Individual game results

Round 1

Seton Hill vs. American International
The Seton Hill Griffins deflected and intercepted a pass by the American International  quarterback Rob Parent with 5:45 left and scored with 5:02 remaining for a 14–7 win over the Yellow Jackets' in the first-ever NCAA playoff game for both programs.

S. Connecticut vs. West Chester
West Chester defeated Southern Connecticut State, 52–32, as Jackson Fagan rushed for 172 yards and three touchdowns. Fagan scored on runs of 61, 7 and 4 yards. QB Joe Wright threw for 250 yards and two touchdowns and the Golden Rams also scored on a 22-yard interception return by defensive tackle Scott Schiavo.

Wayne State vs. Chadron State

Wayne State quarterback Silas Fluellen completed 17 of 40 passes for 236 yards and a touchdown, but could not overcome the 243 yards and three touchdowns by Chadron State quarterback Joe McLain who left the game with an injury as the Eagles defeated the Wildcats, 23–17. Wayne State had four turnovers inside the 10-yard line in the game.

Minnesota State vs. Ashland

In its first ever home playoff game the Ashland University Eagles defeated the Minnesota State-Mankato Mavericks, 27–16. Quarterback Billy Cundiff threw a 66-yard scoring completion to Joe Horn with 11:56 remaining in the fourth quarter as the Eagles took the lead for good. Previously, Ashland was 0–3 in the school's playoff history.

Carson-Newman vs. Valdosta State
The Valdosta State Blazers fell behind early, but rallied in the second half to defeat Carson-Newman Eagles, 24–20. Ronnye Nelson ran for 83 rushing yards and 59 receiving yards for the Blazers. The win was the fifth straight playoff win for the Blazers, the defending NCAA Division II Champions.

Albany State vs. Tusculum

The Tusculum College Pioneers only led the final 3:31 of the game against the Albany State Rams, but scored on three fourth quarter drives to win 34–22. Senior quarterback Corey Russell finished the game with 87 yards rushing and two touchdowns on 15 carries and was 23-of-38 passing for 274 yards and three touchdowns for the Pioneers. Tusculum maintained its streak of no games lost at home in two seasons.

Nebraska-Omaha vs Pittsburg State
Quarterback Mark Smith scored a rushing touchdown that put the Pittsburg State Gorillas out of range of the late-surging University of Nebraska-Omaha Mavericks in a 33–21 win. The 24th-ranked Mavericks took the lead in game, 21–20, with 13:05 left in the game, but the Gorillas took back the lead, 26–21 with 5:27 left in the game. Smith scored on a 32-yard touchdown with 2:10 left in the game to seal the win. Smith finished with 365 yards of total offensive, including 212 rushing yards for the Gorillas.

C. Washington vs. West Texas
Keith Flemming put the West Texas A&M Buffaloes ahead for good with a 6-yard run late in the second quarter in a 49–42 victory over Central Washington Wildcats. Flemming ran for four touchdowns and Keith Null threw three touchdown passes (35 of 49 passes for 463 yards and one interception).

Round 2

West Chester vs. Bloomsburg
The West Chester Golden Rams got a late touchdown pass but failed to recover an onside kick as Bloomsburg held on for a 28–21 victory. A 62-yard interception return for a touchdown by Jesse Cooper in the fourth quarter gave the Huskies a 21–14 lead. Bloomsburg scored on a 28-yard touchdown pass with 3:41 left in the fourth to extend the lead to 28–14.

California (PA) vs. Seton Hill
California University of Pennsylvania's QB Kevin McCabe threw three touchdowns as the Vulcan's defeated Seton Hill, 48–7. McCabe completed 19 of 24 passes for 253 yards. Terrence Johnson ran an 82-yard kickoff return for a touchdown. Seton Hill's lone score came on a 30-yard fumble return for a touchdown.

Chadron State vs. Minnesota Duluth
Minnesota Duluth held Chadron State to just 8 yards rushing for the game in a 20–10 victory. The Bulldogs held the ball for nearly 40 minutes while gaining 388 yards in total offense. The Eagles gained 178 yards in total offense.

Ashland vs. Grand Valley State

The Grand Valley State, the top seed in Super Region 3, defeated Ashland University, 40–7. The Lakers scored on their first two possessions and built a 24–0 halftime lead. Ashland's only score came on the first play of the fourth quarter as quarterback Billy Cundiff hit Christian Livingston with an 8-yard touchdown pass. Grand Valley answered on the next offensive play with a 62-yard touchdown run. The Lakers' defense ended with eight sacks and nine tackles for lost yardage.

Valdosta State vs. North Alabama
North Alabama avenged last season's quarterfinal playoff loss to defending Division II Champion Valdosta State, 37–10, as QB A.J. Milwee threw for 167 yards and one touchdown and ran for another score. The Lions took a 16–3 halftime lead and scored two touchdowns in the third quarter and one in the fourth quarter to seal the win. Valdosta State only touchdown came as Dudley Spence returned a fumble 55-yard for a score in the fourth quarter.

Tusculum vs. Delta State

Delta State compiled 529 yards of offense as QB while Garrett DeWitt threw for 344 yards and backup quarterback Blake Barnes rushed for two touchdowns as the Statesmen defeated Tusculum, 27–19. The Statesmen defense held allowed 425 (310 in the air) but forced Tusculum into three turnovers. The win advanced Delta State to the Division II playoff quarterfinals for the third straight year.

Pittsburg State vs. Northwest Mo.
Northwest Missouri State came from behind to defeat Pittsburg State 38–35. Pittsburg State took the lead with 3 minutes, 30 seconds remaining, but QB Joel Osborn threw a 15-yard touchdown pass to Kendall Wright with 55 seconds left gave the Bearcats a victory. The Gorillas racked up 408 total yards of offense as QB Mark Smith rushed for 123 yards and passed for 185 yards.

West Texas vs. Abilene Christian
The Abilene Christian University Wildcats set a record for points in an NCAA playoff game (93) as they scored touchdowns on 13 of its 15 possessions in a 93–68 defeat of West Texas A&M. The Wildcats compiled 810 total yards as quarterback Billy Malone threw six touchdown passes, each to a different receiver, and completed 16 of 25 passes for 383 yards. Bernard Scott rushed for 292 yards on 19 carries and scored seven touchdowns.

West Texas was led by quarterback Keith Null (42-of-63, 595 yards, seven touchdowns), and Charly Martin who had 14 catches for 323 yards and five TDs as the Buffs compiled 721 total yards of offense.

The Wildcats will play Northwest Missouri State in the national quarterfinals, a rematch of ACU's 44–27 victory on Aug. 30.

Super Regional finals

California (PA) vs. Bloomsburg
California of Pennsylvania eliminated Bloomsburg University, 27–24, to advance to the semifinals. The Vulcans scored two third-quarter touchdowns to take a 27–17 lead, but Bloomsburg scored on a 1-yard run by quarterback Dan Latorre to close the gap to 27–24. The Huskies were attempting a game-winning drive, but the Vulcans linebacker Darren Burns forced a fumble by Latorre on a 28-yard quarterback draw and Brandon Gordon recovered the fumble for the 
Vulcans. The Vulcans then ran out the clock.

Minnesota Duluth vs. Grand Valley
Sophomore linebacker Kiel Fechtelkotter intercepted a pass from Grand Valley State quarterback Brad Iciek in the second overtime to seal a 19–13 double-overtime victory. UMD scored a touchdown in the second overtime, but the Lakers blocked the extra-point attempt. Two plays later, Fechtelkotter made the interception, ending the game.

North Alabama vs. Delta State

The Lions avenged their only loss this season, defeating Delta State, 55–34. While defense gave up 541 yards in total offense to the Statesmen, they also forced six turnovers total and scored twice on defense (interception returns for touchdowns by Darron Dampier and Michael Johnson). Wide receiver Joemal Campbell caught two touchdown passes and blocked a punt for the Lions.

Northwest Mo. vs. Abilene Christian
Northwest Missouri State secured their fourth straight trip to the NCAA Division II semifinals with a 45–36 victory against Abilene Christian. The Bearcats' quarterback Joel Osborn threw for 247 yards (19-of-28) and two touchdowns. Backup quarterback Blake Bolles finished with 69 yards through the air and one touchdown pass, and 51 yards rushing and one touchdown run.

Semifinals

California (PA) vs. Minnesota Duluth
A week after upsetting Grand Valley State, the Minnesota Duluth Bulldogs advanced to the National Championship game with a 45–7 victory over California (Pa.).  The Bulldogs held the Vulcans to their lowest rushing total of the season, while forcing five turnovers. California had averaged nearly 200 yards rushing and 38 points per game this season. Isaac Odim rushed for 126 yards and scored four touchdowns for the Bulldogs.

North Alabama vs. Northwest Mo.
Northwest Missouri State Bearcats played turnover-free football while forcing two North Alabama turnovers en route to a 41–7 victory.  The Bearcats defense held North Alabama to one touchdown as they advanced to their fourth straight national championship game.

Championship

The Minnesota Duluth Bulldogs won the school's first NCAA Division II football championship in a 21–14 win over the Northwest Missouri State Bearcats. Minnesota Duluth's quarterback Ted Schlafke threw  38-yard touchdown pass to Tony Doherty with 14 seconds left in the second quarter to give the Bulldogs a 7–0 lead. Later he threw a  5-yard touchdown midway through the third quarter to Issac Odim for a 14–0 lead. Odim ran for a 4-yard touchdown early in the fourth quarter for a 21–0 lead. Northwest Missouri's first score came on a 44-yard interception return by Aldwin Foster-Rettig cutting the score to 21–7. The Bearcats cut the lead to 21–14 as Raphael Robinson scored on a 2-yard touchdown catch with 1:36 left in the game. Minnesota Duluth recovered an onside kick attempt and ran out the clock.

Minnesota Duluth finished the season with a 15–0 record. Northwest Missouri ended the season with a 13–2 record and suffered its fourth consecutive loss in the Division II championship game.

See also
 2008 NCAA Division II National Football Championship game
 2008 NCAA Division I FBS football season
 2008 NCAA Division I FCS football season
 2008 NCAA Division III football season
 2008 NAIA football season

References